Frederick Leopold Samuel Brockwell (4 February 1871 – 12 February 1945) was an Australian rules footballer who played with Geelong and South Melbourne in the Victorian Football League (VFL).

See also
 The Footballers' Alphabet

Notes

References
 'Follower', "The Footballers' Alphabet", The Leader, (Saturday, 23 July 1898), p.17.

External links 

1871 births
1945 deaths
People educated at Geelong College
Australian rules footballers from Victoria (Australia)
Geelong Football Club (VFA) players
Geelong Football Club players
Sydney Swans players